Aliyudin Ali (born 7 May 1980) is an Indonesian former footballer. He normally plays as a striker.

His favourite player is Michael Owen. His favourite clubs are Real Madrid and Liverpool.

He is a lively and energetic player and the opposing defence often has difficulty guarding him.

Performance in National Team

With U-23 Team
 2003: Sea games

With Senior Team
 2004: Asian Cup and Pre Asian Cup
 2008: AFF Suzuki Cup

Honours

Individual honors
First Division Top Scorer (1): 2001

External links
 
 FIFA Profile

1980 births
Living people
Indonesian Muslims
Indonesian footballers
2004 AFC Asian Cup players
People from Bogor
Indonesia international footballers
Association football forwards
Indonesian Premier Division players
Persikabo Bogor players
Pelita Jaya FC players
Persikota Tangerang players
Persija Jakarta players
Persib Bandung players
Sriwijaya F.C. players
Sportspeople from West Java